"The Ones You Love" is a song performed by English singer-songwriter Rick Astley, written by Astley and Dave West. It was produced by Gary Stevenson and Astley, and recorded for Astley's third album, Body & Soul (1993). The song was released as the album's final single on 23 August 1993 by RCA Records and peaked at number 48 on the UK Singles Chart. After its release, Astley retired from music, and "The Ones You Love" served as his final single until the release of "Sleeping" in October 2001.

Critical reception
Alan Jones from Music Week gave the song three out of five, declaring it as "cheerful, uptempo and commercial, though far inferior to his last hit "Cry for Help" which is included here [on the single]."

Track listing
 "The Ones You Love" (single edit) – 4:20
 "Cry for Help" (single edit) – 4:14
 "The Ones You Love" (instrumental) – 4:21

Personnel
 Rick Astley – lead vocals 
 Dave West – keyboards, bass, drum programming 
 Mark Brzezicki – live drums 
 Derek Green – backing vocals 
 Paul "T.J." Lee – backing vocals 
 Beverley Skeete – backing vocals

Charts

References

 The Ones You Love single at Rickastley.co.uk

1993 singles
1993 songs
RCA Records singles
Rick Astley songs
Songs written by Rick Astley